Enentarzi (en-en₃-tar-zid, also , en-e-tar-zi was Ensi (governor) of Lagash. He was originally a chief-priest of Lagash for the god Ningirsu.

He succeed Enannatum II who only had a short reign and was the last representative of the house of Ur-Nanshe. It seems that the power of Lagash waned at this point, and that other territories such as Umma ("Gishban") and Kish prevailed.

Enentarzi probably ruled for at least 4 years.

An inscription records that 600 Elamites came to plunder Lagash during the rule of Enentarzi, but that they were repelled.

He was succeeded by another priest named Enlitarzi, and then his son Lugalanda.

References

Kings of Lagash
25th-century BC Sumerian kings